Linda Chung Ka-yan (born on 9 April 1984) is a Chinese-Canadian actress, singer and songwriter. She signed a long-term contract with TVB in 2004 after winning the Miss Chinese International. Chung was always Non-official Best Actress during the years in TVB. Chung ended her contract with TVB in early 2018.

As a singer, Chung has released four studio albums, Dinner for One, World for Two (2008), My Love Story (2009), My Private Selection (2011), and Love Love Love (2012).

Chung is currently a YouTube KOL.

Early life

Chung was born in Maple Ridge and raised in Vancouver, British Columbia with an older brother and sister. After graduation from Vancouver's Templeton Secondary School, Chung studied education at the University of British Columbia for two years.

Beginning her public life in 2002, Chung won the title of Miss Crystal Cover Girl, a beauty-talent contest organised and hosted annually by Crystal Mall, an Asian-themed shopping centre located in the Metrotown area of Burnaby, British Columbia.

In 2003, Chung won the title of Miss Chinese Vancouver, along with three other awards at the same event, earning her the chance to participate, and eventually winning Miss Chinese International at the Miss Chinese International Pageant 2004, hosted in Hong Kong. She was praised by Kelly Chen for her sweet face and voice the day before this pageant. Chung became the third contestant from Vancouver in four years to win the title of this annually-held event.

TV career

2004–2005: Entry and initial success

After winning the Miss Chinese International Pageant, Chung was signed under TVB. Chung made her acting debut in the series Virtues of Harmony II, the modern spin-off of the sitcom, Virtues of Harmony. Her performance was somewhat popular in the year, garnering positive reviews from the public. She was nominated for the Most Improved Female Actress award at the 2004's TVB Anniversary Awards for the first time. Chung also participated in several advertisements and music videos within her first year in the industry. This initial success led TVB to name her as one of the "Twelve New Stars."

Other industry professionals also gave praise to Chung during this initial period such as Nancy Sit, Frankie Lam, Kara Hui, Shawn Yue, Chen Kun, Kent Cheng, Sammy Leung, Wong He, Joey Leung and Erica Yuen.

2006–2008: Breakthrough and A-grade actress

In 2006, after starring in Always Ready, The Biter Bitten and Forensic Heroes, Chung won her first major award "Most Improved Female Actress.

Chung's breakthrough role came in 2007, where she played a character named Sheung Joy Sum (lit. meaning: always at heart) in a popular series of that year, Heart of Greed. Chung received much praise from audiences and several famous people. A couple of scenes involving her character generated the highest peaks for the drama's ratings, one was when her character exposed that Alfred Ching Leung deceived her, garnering a 39-point rating; another was when Tong Chi On proposed marriage to her, garnering a 48-point rating. This role gave her a nomination for Best Actress and My Most Favourite Female Character Role for the second year in a row.

During the shooting of A Journey Called Life, Chung received much praise from co-star Steven Ma, for her beauty, good manner, and ripe acting. The two have worked together in a previous collaboration of Virtues of Harmony II.

Among the five series that were released in 2008, Chung received most recognition for her acting in A Journey Called Life. She received praises from Sheren Tang as well as the public. At the 41st TVB Anniversary Awards (2008), Chung was nominated in the top 5 of the Best Actress award for her role in this series. She was also nominated for the top 5 Most Favorite Female Character Award for Legend of the Demigods, her first leading role in a period drama. Chung then acted as Yu So Sum in Moonlight Resonance and received some recognitions for this role. A scene in the drama, telling her fierce exchange with Yan Hung, garnered a 50-point rating, making it the most-watched scene in all TVB series to-date. Chung also received praises from Ha Yu, Michelle Yim and Lee Heung-kam when she was acting this role.

2009–2010: Success in comedy and villain works

In 2009, Chung performed in Ghost Writer, A Watchdog's Tale, Twilight Investigation, as well as Can't Buy Me Love. At the 42nd TVB Anniversary Awards (2009), Chung was nominated top 5 in the Best Supporting Actress for her role in The Gem of Life and this role received praise from Ada Choi, Lee San San and Maggie Shiu.

In 2010, Chung had four series, A Watchdog's Tale released in 2009 actually, but the series got the highest audience rating in the first season in 2010 and top five series in audience rating in the whole year. In A Watchdog's Tale, Chung got another breakthrough while she was acting a likeness of the masculine role. At the 2010 TVB Anniversary Awards, Chung was nominated top 5 in the Best Actress award for her role in Ghost Writer and also nominated top 5 in the Most Favourite Female Character Role award for her role in Can't Buy Me Love. Twilight Investigation was another series in the year, her acting has got approbated yet.

2011–2012: Outstanding years

While Chung was filming the ancient costume drama "River of Wine" in December 2010, she received praise from Bowie Lam as for her weeping scene. Chung was also captured by media to be the "successor of fa-dan" and one of the "Best new-coming fa-dan" with Myolie Wu, Kate Tsui and Fala Chen as the first-class performance of Chung in several series before the day.

In 2011, Chung was the second female lead in "Yes, Sir. Sorry, Sir!." She had just played her character Miss Koo from the 8th episode till the end. Although she only had unrequited love for one of the male lead in the series (Moses Chan), she became the focus for the audience and internet users by the three sections of Miss Koo. First, she appeared as a cool bowling coach initially. Next, Miss Koo seems to be a melting glacier as she was affected by Law Sir (Moses Chan's character), this made the audience pay enthusiastic attention on their sweet and emotional scenes. When it was nearly came to an end, Law Sir's undercover identity was finally revealed, Miss Koo was collapsed since she has been deceived by Law Sir and her sister (Queenie Chu's character). This also left a deep impression in the audiences' mind. The audiences had massive praises for her performance and agreed that she was perfectly capable of competing in Best Actress category for this role at the year-end awards ceremony, despite being second female lead. It was rare that the major newspapers also reported the above matter at the same time. She was not only supported by Chan and Yeung, but she also supported by Queenie Chu, Cilla Kung and Lau Ka Ho. On the whole, Chung received full of praise and Miss Koo is one of the representative work for Linda Chung.

With Chung's amazing performances till mid 2011, TVB Anniversary Awards "Best Actress" Charmaine Sheh, Hong Kong Film Award for Best Director Gordon Chan, Hong Kong Film director Patrick Kong, Hong Kong CR1 DJ, Tvb actress Helen Ma, Kate Tsui and Myolie Wu praised support for her either to be the next "Best Actress" or to get an award in TVB Anniversary Awards, or to be the first-actress.

Finally, she was nominated for Top 5 Best Actress and Most Favourite Female Character Role award for her role in "Yes, Sir. Sorry, Sir!." She got the My Most Supportive Performance award from Ming Pao Anniversary Awards in 2011 for Miss Koo in Yes Sir, Sorry Sir according to voting from audience. However, Miss Koo lost out the Most Favourite Female Character Role award at the 2011 TVB Anniversary Awards, and TVB was criticised as later the actual results of the online voting actually proved her the rightful winner of the Most Favourite Female Character Role award, instead of Myolie Wu. Fans were also outraged that she left the 2011 TVB Anniversary Awards empty handed. Chung started to be the Non-official Best Actress.

Chung filmed "L'Escargot" in 2010 and it was finally aired in 2012. Her character was involved in a complicated love triangle with Michael Tse and Ron Ng's characters. She herself spoke about the many new challenges she faced while portraying her character.  In addition, her relation line with Tse has gained her more public exposure and was the topic of popular discussion. Her show was praised by Gem Tang, Felix Wong and Hinson Chou. On 19 March 2012, her new series Daddy Good Deeds aired and her character Ko Yu-chu spread fun to the public. Her professional attitude and acting were praised by Cilla Kung, Xia Yu and Steven Ma, especially Ma mentioned she was still maintaining the purity of heart and having progress in her acting continually. She and Steven Ma collaborated five times in TVB, was a terrific couple on screen. Her third series House of Harmony and Vengeance was aired on TVB from 30 Apr to 8 June 2012, portraying her as an ancient version of Ms. Cool. Bobby Au Yeung wondered Chung do not know dancing as he had watched she played hula hoop, he mentioned Chung was so hard-working and serious in practising dancing. Bobby said Chung was only alike a little girl in their first starring "Forensic Heroes", however, she is completely changed and honed during these years, either acting or in life. He stated her purity have not changed over the years. Myolie Wu also mentioned the purity of Chung.

Her fourth series Witness Insecurity was aired from 2 to 27 July 2012, making her the actress with the highest exposure rate for the first half of the year, having four series already out and probably nothing left for the rest of the year. Many viewers criticised about the way TVB was showing her series too close to one another. However, Witness Insecurity garnered high TVB viewership ratings, which turned out to be unexpected by TVB. On the ending note, the sad ending for this series also received a huge outcry from viewers, most reflected they preferred a good ending and requested for a re-make of the ending. Not only Chung's acting was praised by public, but she and her co-star Bosco Wong were gaining high popularity to be the new screen couple. She was praised by Paul Chun, co-star Bosco Wong and film director Patrick Kong Chung was again owning great support from public will by Witness Insecurity this year. Jason Chan, Michael Dao, Charmaine Li support Chung to gain an "Best Actress" Award for the year. However, she lost the nomination of My favorite female character role in TVB Awards Anniversary Ceremony 2012 without any reason. The award was given to Kate Tsui at last. Although Chung can gain the nomination and get into top 5 of Best Actress, TVB still received a lot of complaints about Chung not having a nomination of My favorite female character role and it was the second time caused Chung to be the Non-official Best Actress. Moreover, the public voting also proved Chung and Charmaine Sheh as the rightful winner of the actress awards.

In the series Missing You, Chung was leading other new actors and actresses such as Jason Chan, Cilla Kung, Lin Xia Wei, and Calvin Chan. Ram Chiang was the only senior actor there.

2013–2014: Stepped to the peak

In 2013, Chung won the champion of "Ten TV entertainer" by public voting in the Next TV Publishing Ceremony 2013. She has already gained top ten of the TV entertainer for six years consecutively, which proofing her popularity and outstanding performance in the past years. Chung also won the Most Popular Actress in the largest film forum "Vietnam DMA awards ceremony" of the Year Award in two consecutive years in Vietnam.

In May, Chung participated in the variety show "Office of Practical Jokes", which presided by Johnson Lee, acting a plot to treat the world top magician. Her outstanding performance from intimidating by hamsters to injuring magician and Lee, gained much appreciated by the public, and again having widespread media coverage and discussion of internet forums. Not only presided Lee, but many professionals also praised her acting in the plot, such that Gem Tang, Patrick Kong, Sharon Chan, Kitty Yuen, Bob Lam, Ding Tze Ko, Yoyo Mung, Albert Au,
Chung was labelled as the "Best Actress" by the public audiences again and this is the third time for Chung to be the Non-official Best Actress.

Chung starred in 2013 TVB's grand productions 30 episodes Brother's Keeper, co-starring with Ruco Chan. She acted as a fashion designer Rachel Cheuk. The series spans from 1991 to 2013. Chung and her co-star Ruco Chan became a screen couple as their co-operation gaining high popularity in the public. Chung gained support by co-star Ruco Chan, Joe Ma, Fala Chen, Joey Man, Tavia Yeung, Niki Chow, Kate Tsui, Myolie Wu, and so on, to get the "Best Actress" that year. On 1 December 2013, Chung finally got her first Best Actress in "TVB Awards Ceremony 2013 Malaysia Star Ceremony", as the award is 100% by public voting. Chung was not only gained the "Best Actress", but she also gained the My Favorite TV Role, became the first 1980s artist to win the "Best Actress" title.

In 2014, Chung filmed TVB Gold New Year 2014 micro film "A Time of Love", starring with South Korea actor Yeon Jung-hoon. Their segment was the most popular episode in the whole set although broadcast on Saturday, gained up to 28 points in rating.

On 26 March, the Hong Kong University of Science and Technology invited Chung to a one-hour lecture of "Meet the Professional Series III: Road to Leading Actress – Linda Chung" as the theme for sharing with students about the choice of life, transformation, and practice the ideal. Chung is the first Hong Kong TV actress to be a lecturer who was invited to the university.

Her series for 2014 were Tiger Cubs II and All That Is Bitter Is Sweet.

2015–2018: End works in TVB 

Chung's only series for 2015 is Limelight Years, co-starred with Damian Lau, Liza Wang, Alex Fong among others, while she was busy with work in the music industry. Damian Lau and Liza Wang had highly praised towards Chung about her attitude and performance in Limelight Years.

David Siu mentioned Chung has potential on acting in an interview. He likes Chung acted from basic til qualified right now, sometimes provided new elements in her performance as well. Chow Yun-fat also mentioned Chung acting well, especially in the variety show Office of Practical Jokes, Chow informed Chung continue to maintain these standards in her acting. Gloria Tang mentioned she wish to depend on the target of Chung, about her standard of acting and her attitude. In addition, Chung was supported by Wayne Lai, Liza Wang and Gloria Tang to earn "Best Actress" in TVB Anniversary Ceremony. Chung won Mainland China's Favourite TVB Actress as the result was 100% totally vote by mainland netizens in TVB Anniversary Ceremony. She got the fourth time to be the Non-official Best Actress in 2015 due to the online voting for "Best Actress" in oncc.

In 2016, Chung starred in the drama  K9 Cop alongside Bosco Wong, and made a brief appearance in the sequel of her 2013 series Brother's Keeper, Brother's Keeper II. Several juniors mentioned Chung acts well and is a good role model in TV and entertainment industry, such as Gloria Tang Pui Yee, Hana Kuk, Adrien Yau,Jackson Wang, Carlos Chan, Kayan Yau, and Malaysian Singer Melody Tan.

In 2018, she made a guest appearance in Another Era, starring opposite Frankie Lam, Lam said Chung became mature than Forensic Heroes 12 years before.

On 7 March 2018, her pregnancy wasn't the only thing that Chung announced on social media recently, as she also revealed that she would no longer be a part of TVB. She shared the news in the same post that was published last weekend, stated that she has decided to leave TVB after 13 years with the company. She wrote, "I remember being only 19 when I joined Miss Chinese International and not understanding anything, no self-confidence, and was very shy. TVB was my shelter. They taught me many things and gave me the opportunity to grow and develop myself, help me discover who I am, my talent, and my mission. They gave me the courage to show my true self to the public." Linda also mentioned several names that she is in gratitude for, including TVB Executive Virginia Lok whom she described as a mother figure who protected her, and Catherine Tsang, who gave Linda her first break. She also thanked Voice Entertainment's Herman Ho, for helping her achieve her dream of becoming a singer, and TVB Executive Sandy Yue, who gave her the opportunity to gain more experience from doing variety shows."Finally, thank you very much for all the other executives of TVB's top management. Without your hard work and support, I will not be at where I am today. I am forever grateful! We may be saying goodbye now, but I do feel like we are going to meet again soon," she added.

2019-Present: Open-ended 

In 2020, Chung returned to TVB and filmed the medical drama Kids' Lives Matter. The drama was broadcast in 2021. Florence Kwok stated Chung was a hardworking girl when they starred in Forensic Heroes, they had a lot more chemistry after these years. Again, she received attention and was highly praised by netizens for her performance, for which she became the strongest contender for the Best Actress award. With her role in this drama, she won the Best TVB Actress in Malaysia award, and is placed among the top 5 nominees for both the Best Actress and Most Popular Female Character. Many netizens, including Hong Kong, Malaysia and Mainland, complained the final result in TVB anniversary award 2021, especially mentioned Best Actress should return to Chung. She also nominates Best Actress in non-official TV awards and as the champion for long, but she became the first runner-up by 24.92% and 14,576 votes at the last minute. The year caused Chung the fifth time to be the Non-official Best Actress.

In 2022, Chung mentioned she won't return to TVB in the future on the stage of TVB anniversary award 2021, she also added her feelings in YouTube channel. However, Chung mentioned she loves ViuTV newcomers Mirror consecutively in public instead of TVB newcomers, especially Anson Lo and Keung To. She also stated she may accept any offers in future years at public event, including ViuTV.

Film career

2007: Newcomer

When Chung filmed her first film, Love Is Not All Around, alongside Alex Fong, Stephy Tang and Sammy Leung in 2007, she was praised by its director Patrick Kong. She was nominated for "Best New Performer" for her role Ching Ching and won the Silver Award. Chung has already succeeded in entering the films industry, the same year as Kate Tsui.

2008–2010: Leading
Chung first became the leading actress in the film Playboy Cops in 2008. She received praises in the last scenes. She acted as a guest star in the similar movie of  Love Is Not All Around, L for Love, L for Lies, where she also got praise from the performance.

Her latest film in 2010 is 72 Tenants of Prosperity. Chung received praise from Eric Tsang for her hard work and purity, and also especially receive praises from Hong Kong Film Awards "Best Actress" Anita Yuen for her effort, positive personality, hard work and improvement in this movie.

As Chung charmingly interprets in TVB series, Hong Kong Film Award for Best Director Gordon Chan commended Chung calling her the best young actress who come from TV station and one of the best actress in Hong Kong.

Music career

2008–2009: First attempt at success
In addition to acting, Chung used to receive praise in some live show for her singing. Chung has sung the theme songs for some of the series that she has starred in then, including her first personal song "Swear" for Legends of Demigods, Best Bet, A Journey Called Life, A Watchdog's Tale and the subtheme for Heart of Greed. Chung has also sung the children's songs, which were welcomed by children. In May 2008, Chung signed a deal with Star Entertainment which launched her into a successful music career. Her first album was released on 20 August. Her album "Dinner for One, World for Two" achieved Gold Status in Hong Kong based on the number of sales and she earned the title of "The Best Selling Female Bewcomer" in the year.  This album garnered her several awards at the end of 2008, including "Gold Newcomer Awards" and "Most liked Female Newcomer." Her first plugged song was "World for Two." Her second plugged song "I'm actually unhappy" got a high click rating in YouTube. Due to its success, Star Entertainment released a second version of her album, Dinner for One, World for Two Reloaded, which included more songs and more bonus material.

Her second album, My Love Story, was released on 12 November 2009 and has since been classified gold. The songs of "Thinking of you day and night", "One Day" and "Life and Death for Love" were all owe to her works on melody. Among these three songs, "Thinking of you day and night" was the first plugged song and was much more conspicuous. Chung won awards in different music platforms based on this song. "Fighting in the light and shadows" was the second plugged song. She has since collaborated with another Star Entertainment singer, Stephanie Cheng. "Ngoi Dak Hei (Ai De Qi)" is the product of their co-operation. This song reached the champion on TVB's JSG Solid Gold programme.

2010–2011: Approved works

Her new song "If You Want Me" has just released in January 2011. Chung was praised by CR2 DJ Vani Wong, Alton Yu and Wasabi for her outstanding performance. Apart from the above, she received much praises from three DJ who are in the CR2 "The Playtoy Mansion" program and she was also praised by Sammy Leung and Siu Yi in the CR2 "Good Morning King" program in February, for her "Jade Girl" image which is not only an image in the entertainment industry, but she also behaves in reality.

In 2011, her third album, My Private Selection, was released on 25 March. The album was qualitatively new songs plus choiceness. It was not only recorded her first plugged song "If you want me", but it also recorded another four new recording songs "Luo Suo", "De Xian Zhao Ni", "I'll Be Waiting For You", "Ngoi Dak Hei (Ai De Qi) solo version" and her thirteen choiceness songs from Dinner for One, World for Two debut album and My Love Story.

2012–present: Love Love Love & Solo Concerts

In 2012, Chung released her 4th studio album Love Love Love. This album has been certified Gold and sold out quickly. The album reached the #1 in sales chart and entered the sales chart of the LP Chamber of Commerce in Hong Kong for more than 5 weeks, gaining #2 for 2 weeks. Her first plug Vaccine reached #1 of JSG chart and her second plug You are my other half reached #1 of 3 musical chart, including RTHK, MRHNA and JSG. She is the first and only TVB Canadian pop singer who got three No. 1 in the four major musical charts in the nearest 12 years. Stars Shine, Chung's music company, compiled and released a second edition of the album, removing one song and including the theme song of her currently airing series Missing You. Chung gained her first "Female Singer Award" in MRHNA Musical Ceremony 2012, which continued gained the same award in 2013.

First solo concert
In August 2013, Chung held her first solo concert dated 22 and 23 August. It was held at Kowloon Bay Trade & Exhibition Centre. Her concert gained a full house. During the concert she received massive warmth and support from her fans. She invited 3 guests such as Janice M. Vidal, newcomer Ally Tse, and especially top female singer Kelly Chen. When Kelly Chen sang with Chung, it gained a climax of the whole concert. When Chung sang "Friendship is just that simple" and played with her piano, the concert was going to another climax.

In December 2014, Chung held "Most Blessing" Live Concert in Malaysia 2014 on 20 December at Arena of Stars. She invited Kristal Tin and Alex Fong as guest performers. The concert achieved a great success.

Personal life
In 2014, Chung was invited to speak at the Hong Kong University of Science and Technology.  She spoke about her battle with depression after joining the entertainment industry. At the start of her career, Linda faced severe pressure from a heavy workload and suffered loneliness from being far away from home. She said: "I didn’t know anything so I had a lot of pressure. I was also afraid to talk to someone about it, especially those close to me. During that time, I would cry as soon as I returned home." She eventually worked through the hard times and gained her emotional strength.

As part of TVB, Chung was "the youngest A-grade actress,  and the highest paid TVB actress, earning around HK$120,000 per event, until 2015. Chung is also a devoted Christian and Philip Ng is her ex-boyfriend.

Chung married chiropractor Jeremy Leung in fall 2015. Despite the age gap, Chung stated that their relationship developed due to similar interests and understanding of one another. When paparazzi asked Chung's parents if they approve of their son in law, Chung's parents responded confidently with an approval.

Chung announced her pregnancy on Mother's Day 2016. She revealed on 27 August 2016 that she had given birth to a daughter named Kelly Leung. She announced the birth of her second child, Jared Leung, on 6 September 2018. On 10 April 2022, Chung announced on Instagram that she was pregnant with the couple’s third child.

Filmography

Television dramas

TVB Sales Presentation
The following series only appeared in TVB Sales Presentation or Chung not starred in final piece

Films

Dubbing

Variety shows

Music Video

Discography

Albums

Studio albums

Compilation albums

Split albums

Singles

Charted singles

TV & animated singles

Compositions

Covers

Commercial Singles

Tours
Linda Chung Love Love Love Concert 2013 in Hong Kong
Linda Chung Love Concert 2014 in Malaysia

Books
Photo-book - happiness (幸·福) in 2013

Commercial Adverts

TVB Official Adverts

Awards

Major music awards statistics

2021
TVB Anniversary Awards 2021 - Favourite TVB Actress in Malaysia (Kids' Lives Matter)

2015
Starhub TVB Awards 2015 – My Favourite TVB Female TV Character (Tiger Cubs II)
Starhub TVB Awards 2015 – Bottomslim The Perfect Figure Award

2014
Starhub TVB Awards 2014 – My Favourite TVB Female TV Character (All That Is Bitter Is Sweet)
Starhub TVB Awards 2014 – Red Carpet Star

2013
Astro TVB Star Awards 2013 – My Favourite TVB Actress in a Leading Role (Brother's Keeper)
Starhub TVB Awards 2013 – My Favourite TVB Female TV Character (Witness Insecurity)
Starhub TVB Awards 2013 – Everlasting Glow Award
Starhub TVB Awards 2013 – Red Carpet Star

2012
My AOD Favourite Award – Top 15 Character Ranked No. 3
 Starhub TVB Award 2012 – Perfect Smile Award.
 Starhub TVB Award 2012 – My Favorite TVB Onscreen Couple (Yes Sir, Sorry Sir)
 Starhub TVB Award 2012 – My Favorite TVB Female Character (L'Escargot)
 Vietnam DMA Presentation Ceremony 2011 – Most Popular Female Actress (Hong Kong)
 Next TV Awards 2012 – Ranked No. 5 Song Award
 Next TV Awards 2012 – Toshiba Award

2011
 Ming Pao Anniversary Awards 2011 – My Most Supportive Performance (Yes Sir, Sorry Sir)
 My AOD Malaysia My Favourite TVB Series Presentation 2011 – Top 10 My Favourite Character
 Next TV Awards 2011 – Ranked No. 6 Song Award
 JSG First Round Music Awards 2011 – Song Award (If You Want Me)
 JSG Music Awards 2010 – Best Duet – Bronze (with Stephanie Cheng)

2010
 My AOD Malaysia My Favourite TVB Series Presentation 2010 – My Favourite Character
 JSG First Round Music Awards 2010 – Best Duet Song Award (with Stephanie Cheng)
 JSG First Round Music Awards 2010 – Song Award
 Next TV Awards 2010 – Polo Santa Roberta Award
 Next TV Awards 2010 – Ranked No. 6 Song Award
 Award Ceremony – Most Improved Singer Award
 Sina Music Awards – Top 20 Song (Missing You Day & Night)
 JSG Music Awards 2009 – Best Duet Bronze Award (with Phillip Wei)
 JSG Music Awards 2009 – Best Performance Award – Bronze Song Award

2009
 Metro Radio Hits 2009 Awards – Best Metro Radio Hits Best Second Year Singer (Female)
 Metro Radio Hits 2009 Awards – Best Karaoke Song (Missing You Day & Night)
 JSG third round Music Awards – song award (Missing you day and night)
 Yes! Idol Award Presentation 2009 – Karaoke Female Idol
 Yes! Idol Award Presentation 2009 – 2009 Yes Idol
 Next TV Awards 2009 – Ranked No. 6 Song Award
 IFPI Hong Kong CD Sales Presentation 2008 – Most Sales Hong Kong Female newcomer
 Astro Awards 2008 – My Favorite Character 2008 – Sheung Joy Sum
 Astro Awards 2008 – Favorite Onscreen Couple 2008 (with Raymond Lam)
 RTHK Top 10 Gold Songs Awards – Best Female Newcomer Outstanding Award
 Sina Music Awards 2008 – My Favourite Female Newcomer 2008 – Gold
 Award Ceremony 2008 – Newcomer Awards 2008
 JSG Music Awards 2008 – Best Female Newcomer 2008 – Silver

2008
 Metro Radio Hits Music Award Presentation 2008 – Metro Radio Hits King of New Singers Award 2008 – (Female) Linda Chung
 Yes! Idol Award Presentation 2008 – Most Rise TV Idol
 Yes! Idol Award Presentation 2008 – King of New Singers Award 2008 – (Female)
 JSG Third Round Music Awards 2008 – Song Award
 Metro Radio Newcomer Presentation 2008 – Best Live Female Performer 2008
 TVB8 Music Awards 2008 – Best Newcomer Silver Award 2008
 Yahoo! Buzz Awards 2008 – Most Rise in Searches Newcomer Artist 2008
 Metro Radio Children's Song Presentation 2008 – Song of the Year
 Metro Radio Children' Song Presentation 2008 – Top 10 Song
 TVB Children's Song Presentation 2008 – Golden Song Award
 TVB Children's Song Presentation 2008 – Top 10 Song
 Hong Kong Film Directors' Society – Silver Song Award
 27th Hong Kong Film Awards – Nomination of Best New Performer
 Next TV Awards 2008 – Ranked No. 9 Song Award

2007
 Metro Radio Children's Song Presentation 2007 – Top 10 Song
 TVB Children's Song Presentation 2007 – Top 10 Song
 Next TV Awards 2007 – Healthiest Star
 Yahoo! Buzz Awards 2007 – Most Rise in Searches TV Artist 2007
 Next TV Awards 2007 – mYoga Female Artist Award

2006
 TVB Anniversary Awards 2006 – Most Improved Female Actress Award 2006
 Next TV Awards 2006 – Yumei Award

2005
 Magazine of Week 8 – Most Perfect Smile

2004
 Miss Chinese International 2004 – Champion

2003
 Miss Chinese Vancouver 2003 – Champion
 Miss Chinese Vancouver 2003 – Miss Photogenic
 Miss Chinese Vancouver 2003 – Miss Talent
 Miss Chinese Vancouver 2003 – Miss Snow Beauty

2002
 Miss Crystal Cover Girl 2002 – Champion
 Miss Crystal Cover Girl 2002 – Best Swimsuit Performance

References

External links

Linda Chung Official Website
Linda Chung on Weibo
Official TVB Blog of Linda Chung
Miss Chinese International Profile

|-

1984 births
21st-century Hong Kong actresses
21st-century Canadian actresses
Actresses from British Columbia
Canadian actresses of Hong Kong descent
Canadian film actresses
Canadian emigrants to Hong Kong
Canadian television actresses
Cantonese people
21st-century Hong Kong women singers
Hong Kong film actresses
Hong Kong television actresses
Living people
Miss Chinese International winners
Musicians from British Columbia
People from Maoming
People from Maple Ridge, British Columbia
People with acquired permanent residency of Hong Kong
TVB actors
University of British Columbia Faculty of Education alumni
Canadian women pop singers
21st-century Canadian women singers
Canadian-born Hong Kong artists
Canadian actresses of Chinese descent
Canadian actresses of Asian descent
Canadian YouTubers